George Thackeray (22 July 1806 – 9 October 1875) was an English cricketer with amateur status.

Thackeray was educated at Eton and King's College, Cambridge. He is recorded as playing in one first-class match for Cambridge University Cricket Club in 1826, totalling 5 runs with a highest score of 5 and holding no catches. He graduated BA in 1830, having already become a fellow of the college in 1829. He continued as a fellow until 1841, during which he was ordained as a Church of England priest in 1833. He was rector of Hemingby, Lincolnshire, 1840–75.

References

1806 births
1875 deaths
People educated at Eton College
Alumni of King's College, Cambridge
Cambridge University cricketers
English cricketers
English cricketers of 1826 to 1863
Fellows of King's College, Cambridge
19th-century English Anglican priests